Dr. Thomas Custis Parramore (1932-2004) was a Professor Emeritus of History at Meredith College, retiring in 1992 as well as a prominent author on the subject of North Carolina history and the recipient of numerous historical association awards. He was elected as member of the North Carolinana Society recognizing his "adjudged performance" in support of North Carolina's historical, literature, and culture.

Education
A native of Winton, North Carolina, and a graduate of Ahoskie High School. Parramore held 3 degrees: a bachelor's, a master's and a doctoral degree in English
history from the University of North Carolina at Chapel Hill.

Career
He taught history at Meredith College for 30 years and retired from teaching in 1992.

Awards
James Harvey Robinson Award from the American Historical Association
Special Book Award from the Society of North Carolina Historians
Pauline Davis Perry Award for Excellence in Research and Writing at Meredith College
Meredith College Distinguished Faculty Lecture, 1977

Publications
Parramore wrote extensively on the history of North Carolina and surrounding area. His publications include:

Launching the Craft; The First Half-Century of Freemasonry in North Carolina; Grand Lodge of North Carolina; 1975 Raleigh, NC

References

2004 deaths
20th-century American historians
20th-century American male writers
Meredith College faculty
1932 births
People from Winton, North Carolina
American male non-fiction writers